Jerry Avenaim (born August 21, 1961) is an American photographer best known for his fashion and celebrity images.

Early life
Avenaim's Jewish parents left Egypt and went to Paris, France, during the Suez Canal crisis in the 1950s and later emigrated to the United States where he was born. As a teenager, Avenaim got his first camera – an all-manual 35mm Exakta that his father had brought over from Paris. He was raised in Chicago, Illinois.

Career

Early work
At age 19, Avenaim started his career as assistant to photographer Patrick Demarchelier in New York. When he began to work independently in 1985 his first assignment was a foreign edition Vogue cover of supermodel Cindy Crawford. Later he lived and worked out of Milan for Italian Vogue under the direction of editor in chief Franca Sozzani.

Commercial photography

Avenaim resides in Los Angeles, California, and his work contains a focus on portrait photography of higher-end clientele. Avenaim has photographed fashion and celebrity for magazines including Vogue, GQ, Vanity Fair, Newsweek, and Glamour. His work has appeared on the covers of Vogue, Newsweek, People, TV Guide, and Detour. Avenaim's celebrity portraits include Halle Berry, Helen Hunt, Jeff Bridges, Mel Gibson, Phil McGraw, Angela Bassett, Patricia Arquette, Brooke Shields, and Julia Roberts. Avenaim's photo of Halle Berry appeared on the cover of the People (magazine) Yearbook issue as Picture of the Year in January 2003.

In 2003 Avenaim produced a piece for ZugaPhoto.TV discussing "lighting techniques for photographing celebrities". Avenaim appeared on the ZugaPhoto.TV DVD How to Take Great Pictures which was released in 2004. In 2003, Avenaim was at work on a compilation book project of nude portraits titled Naked Truth. In 2004 Avenaim led a live photoshoot and workshop at the PhotoImaging & Design Expo (PIDE) in San Diego, California, and at the 2005 PIDE conference he gave a two-part seminar on his celebrity portrait work and lighting techniques.

J. Walter Thompson agency chose Avenaim to photograph country music singer Toby Keith for their 2005 advertising campaign for Ford trucks and sport utility vehicles. Avenaim's photograph of Donald Trump appears on the cover of the 2005 book Donald Trump: Master Apprentice by Gwenda Blair. Naked Truth was not yet published in 2006, and at the time Avenaim was also working on a book project titled LUMINOSITY: The Fine Art of Photographing Celebrities. Photographer Rolando Gomez cited a lighting technique he learned from Avenaim in his 2006 book Garage Glamour: Digital Nude and Beauty Photography Made Simple. Avenaim is sponsored as an "Elite Photographer" by Lexar Media. And a "Master Photographer" by Mamiya cameras and Profoto lighting.

Television appearances 
Jerry Avenaim has appeared on numerous reality and talk shows including Dr. Phil. More recently Avenaim has appeared as himself on America's Next Top Model, Germany's Next Topmodel, Kimora Lee Simmons on her show Kimora: Life in the Fab Lane and on "America's Money Class with Suze Orman" which premiered on OWN: Oprah Winfrey Network in January 2012.

Personal life 
Jerry Avenaim lives in Los Angeles. He is a mental health advocate.

Recognition and awards 
 American Photographer New Faces 1988
 Kodak Icon Award 2005
 Canon_Inc. "Explorer of Light" 2007
 Profoto "Master of Light" Award 2010

References

External links 

 Jerry Avenaim Photography website
 

Living people
1961 births
Fashion photographers
American portrait photographers
Artists from Chicago
American people of Egyptian descent
American people of Egyptian-Jewish descent
American Jews